Bladensburg Dueling Grounds is a small spit of land, a fraction of its original size, along Dueling Creek, formerly in the town of Bladensburg, Maryland, and now within the town of Colmar Manor, just to the northeast of Washington, D.C., United States. Dueling Creek, formerly known as '"Blood Run" and "The Dark and Bloody Grounds", is a tributary of the Anacostia River, which was formerly, called the East Branch Potomac River.

From 1808 the grove witnessed approximately fifty duels by gentlemen, military officers, and politicians, settling "affairs of honor". A formalized set of rules and etiquette, the code duello was usually enforced by the duelers and their seconds. The exact number of duels and the names of all the participants who fought at Bladensburg may never be known because surviving records are obscure, the events are not well documented - and  dueling was illegal.
 
Following the Civil War, dueling fell out of favor as a means of settling personal grievances and declined rapidly; the last known duel was fought here in 1868.

Notable duels
In 1808, U.S. Representative Barent Gardenier of New York, fought a duel with U.S. Representative George W. Campbell, from Tennessee, resulting from opposition by Gardenier to the presidential administration of Thomas Jefferson backing a trade embargo with Great Britain and France.  Gardenier challenged Campbell, and their duel was notable as being the first to be fought on what became the Bladensburg Dueling Grounds.  Barent Gardenier was wounded but subsequently recovered and won reelection.
 In 1819, Colonel John Mason McCarty killed his second cousin, General Armistead Thomson Mason. McCarty was haunted for years by his experience after surviving the musket duel.
 Naval hero Commodore Stephen Decatur was mortally wounded, in 1820, by Commodore James Barron.  Where Decatur and Barron dueled is no longer included, within the boundaries of the current Dueling Creek Park.
 In June 1836, 22-year-old Daniel Key, the son of Francis Scott Key, was killed in a duel with a fellow Naval Academy midshipman John Sherbourne over a question regarding steamboat speed.
 Congressman Jonathan Cilley, a representative from Maine, was a reluctant participant. In February 1838, Cilley was killed by Congressman William J. Graves of Kentucky. Graves was a stand-in for New York newspaper editor James Webb, whom Cilley had called corrupt. Cilley was inexperienced with guns, and Graves was allowed to use a powerful rifle. A severed artery, in the leg of Cilley, caused him to bleed to death in ninety seconds. This duel prompted passage of a Congressional act of February 20, 1839, prohibiting the giving or accepting challenges to a duel within the District of Columbia.
 General A. Galletin Lawrence, U.S. Minister to Costa Rica and Baron Kusserow, Secretary of the German Legation, fought a bloodless duel in 1868, being the last recorded duel fought at the Bladensburg Dueling Grounds.

References
 Hauck, Dennis William, Haunted Places, The National Directory
 Holland, Barbara, Gentlemen's Blood: A History of Dueling from Swords at Dawn to Pistols at Dusk
 Thompson Mason, Armistead, The Bladensburg Dueling Ground (Harper's Magazine)

External links
 
 Dark and Bloody Ground
 
 
 
 
 
 
 "Beyond the Battle: Bladensburg Rediscovered" exhibit at the University of Maryland, College Park

Dueling
Geography of Prince George's County, Maryland
Bladensburg, Maryland
History of the United States Congress